Robin Williams: Come Inside My Mind is a 2018 American documentary film directed by Marina Zenovich, celebrating the life and career of comedian Robin Williams, who died in 2014. An HBO production, it features interviews with Whoopi Goldberg, David Letterman, Billy Crystal, among others. It also includes outtakes and little known clips from Williams' stand-up routines.

The film played six sell-out screenings at the Sundance Film Festival in 2018. It was also screened at the Nantucket Film Festival and had a first HBO broadcast on July 16, 2018. That same summer, the documentary was shown at the Hamptons International Film Festival SummerDocs. A discussion with Zenovich and Q&A host Alec Baldwin followed the Hamptons screening.

Reception
The website's critical consensus reads, "Robin Williams: Come Inside My Mind offers a poignant -- albeit tantalizingly incomplete -- peek behind the curtain of a brilliant performer's tragically curtailed life and career." On Metacritic, the film has a weighted average score of 78 out of 100, based on 19 critics, indicating "generally favorable reviews".

Variety described the film as being "sharp-edged, humane, and deeply researched enough to take you closer to the manic engine of Williams' brilliance and pain".

References

External links

American documentary films
HBO documentary films
Cultural depictions of Robin Williams
2018 documentary films
2010s English-language films
2010s American films
English-language documentary films